Milan Raspopović (Serbian Cyrillic: Милан Распоповић) was one of the members of the commission for the establishment of Mathematical Gymnasium Belgrade (abbr. MG) in 1963. He was the first MG physics professor from 1966, and the creator of the MG Physics Curriculum. He was also an MG professor of electronics, and MG principal and director, elected to office in 1970. Raspopović served in parallel as both Principal and Director of Mathematical Gymnasium Belgrade for 32 years, until his retirement in 2002.

Education 
Milan Raspopović received his PhD degree in Physics and  Philosophy from University of Belgrade. 

He successfully defended his PhD thesis entitled "The impact of Ludwig Boltzmann’s teachings and understandings on physics and philosophy" at the Faculty of Electrical Engineering, University of Belgrade.

Career 

Raspopović was the first professor of Physics at Mathematical Gymnasium Belgrade – Special Mathematical Gymnasium (a school of Special National Interest), and the creator of the school's unique physics and overall curriculum.

Raspopović taught university level courses at University of Belgrade, University of Niš, University of Kragujevac, and University of Montenegro. During that time he was principal and director at Mathematical Gymnasium Belgrade.

Raspopović and Emilo Danilović, then Serbian Chief Scientific Advisor for physics, created the first MG curriculum in physics.

Textbooks 
Raspopović is the author or co-author of over 30 textbooks and collections of assignments in physics, for elementary and secondary schools. In the area of physics for elementary schools, as well as in the area of textbooks and collections of assignments for high schools of technical sciences (electrical engineering and mechanical engineering), for high schools of natural sciences and mathematics and natural science curricular stream in gymnasiums, in didactics, and including his special physics textbooks for Special School for Gifted Matematička gimnazija, professor Raspopović's books have the largest circulation in Serbia, Montenegro, and in former Yugoslavia.

Raspopović also co-authored textbooks and collections of solved problems with professors from Mathematical Gymnasium.

Awards 
Raspopovic was awarded the Sretenje Order (3rd class) in February 2015, "for special merits for the Republic of Serbia and its citizens in educational and pedagogical activities".

International results 
Raspopović led the school as its principal and director for 32 years. During that time, the school achieved unique results worldwide regarding the number of gold, silver, and bronze medals won at the International Science Olympiads:
 International Mathematical Olympiads,
 International Physics Olympiads,
 International Olympiads in Informatics,
 International Astronomy Olympiads,
 International Olympiads on Astronomy and Astrophysics, and
 International Earth Science Olympiads,

The school held records for winning more than 400 medals at international competitions and Olympiads, and for graduating scientists with approximately 2000 PhD's among its alumni.

It was not unusual that most, and sometimes all, of the medals at Republics or Federal competitions in Serbia and in Socialist Federative Republic of Yugoslavia, in all categories and for every single grade, were won by students of Mathematical Gymnasium Belgrade. Consequently, Yugoslavian teams for International Olympiads consisted of mostly or only students from Mathematical Gymnasium Belgrade. In 1974, a turbulent year for Yugoslavia when the new Constitution of Yugoslavia was introduced, 7 out of 8 members of Yugoslavian National Team for International Mathematical Olympiad – IMO, were from Mathematical Gymnasium Belgrade. It caused political comment since Yugoslavia had six Republics and seven out of eight students for IMO came from Belgrade's Mathematical Gymnasium. The critics were answered when the Yugoslav team (7 out of 8 were MG students) came back from the IMO with five medals: two gold, one silver, and two bronze. Yugoslavia ranked 5th in the world, and USSR and Yugoslavia were the only 2 countries that won two gold medals that year. Mathematical Gymnasium was the absolute winner among all schools in the world, and remained at that position to the present day. In 2010, the Serbian national team for IMO had MG students only. They ranked 10th in the world as a country (Serbia) and took the first place in the world as a school.

Retirement 
Raspopović was professor in Mathematical Gymnasium Belgrade from the school's foundation days in 1966, and was elected Principal and Director in 1970. He served as Principal and Director until his retirement, effective from 2002. He was succeeded as a Principal by Ljubomir Protić of the Faculty of Mathematics, University of Belgrade.

Milan Raspopović remained an active member of the Mathematical Gymnasium Trust and Mathematical Gymnasium Scientific Board.

References

External links 

 History of Matematička gimnazija 
 Achievements and awards – MG 

1936 births
Education in Belgrade
University of Belgrade School of Electrical Engineering alumni
Serbian people of Montenegrin descent
Serbs of Montenegro
Living people
Heads of schools in Serbia
Place of birth missing (living people)